The blotched snake eel (Ophichthus erabo) is a species of eel in the family Ophichthidae. It is a marine, subtropical eel which is known from the Indo-Pacific, including South Africa, Japan and Taiwan. It dwells at a maximum depth of 155 metres, inhabits reefs and leads a benthic life, forming burrows in sand. Males can reach a maximum total length of 72 centimetres.

References

Taxa named by David Starr Jordan
Taxa named by John Otterbein Snyder
Ophichthus
Marine fish of South Africa
Marine fauna of East Asia
Fish described in 1901